Localish (formerly Live Well Network) is a digital multicast television network owned by ABC Owned Television Stations, a division of The Walt Disney Company.

Localish's 24/7 channel streams on Hulu Live and on linear TV, and its flagship shows including More in Common and Localish Legends air on ABC in major US cities, Localish.com, and Hulu. As of 2020, Localish reached an audience of over 17 million TV households and 21 million social followers across its ABC platforms.

History
Disney launched its Localish media venture the week of September 20, 2018. Localish's lineup of TV and digital shows highlight a range of small businesses, local restaurants, and unique neighborhoods across America.  With over 70% of its audience under the age of 45, the Localish network reaches millennials via locally sourced video stories released on ABC's digital, social and TV platforms. The first series, More in Common, had already appeared via Facebook Watch on July 21, 2018. The station group was considering the possibility of an OTT channel for the brand. A More in Common compilation special was broadcast on all ABC station's primary channels on November 4, 2018 with WPVI-TV, Philadelphia also on November 3 then on their LiveWell Network subchannel (.2) from November 4 through 11, 2018.

On January 21, 2020, ABC Owned Television Stations announced that the network would be rebranded as Localish on February 17, 2020. The rebranded network serves as an expansion of the Localish brand featuring several programs already featured on the Localish website.

As Live Well Network
Prior to launching Localish, ABC Owned Television Stations (ABCOTS) began development of a potential subchannel network in 2007. To appeal to ABC affiliates not owned and operated by the network, it was decided not to use ABC branding in any way.

Live Well Network was launched on April 27, 2009, in high definition on ABC's owned-and-operated stations as part of the stations' subchannels. Initially, the network only had three hours of original programming that are looped throughout the day which was all sourced from ABC stations. In September 2010, Belo became the first non-ABC group to sign on with the network, adding it to their stations on November 8, 2010. Not all of the Belo-owned stations originally aired the network in widescreen (unlike the ABC group), which led the network to drop the "HD" from its branding to become simply "Live Well Network".

Two LWN owned and operated stations, WJRT and WTVG, were sold to Lilly Broadcasting closing on April 1, 2011. On May 26, 2011, it was announced that a deal has been reached to air the network on nine Scripps-owned stations (several, but not all of them, are ABC affiliates). In August 2011, the network picked up CBC Television's Steven and Chris for broadcast starting that fall.

On January 9, 2012, Citadel Communications announced that it would be adding Live Well to all five of its major network-affiliated stations (four of them ABC affiliates), bringing the network's reach to around 55% U.S. television households. Young Broadcasting announced the addition of most of their stations to the network as of the end of January 2012; carriage agreements were maintained when Young was purchased by Media General in November 2013.

In 2012, many ABC affiliates switching to the Live Well Network dropped Retro Television Network. A 1-hour two-week LWN block was broadcast on Soapnet weeknights from 11 PM to 12 AM (ET/PT) starting on July 30, 2012, through Friday, August 10, 2012.

The network lost affiliates in Memphis and Jackson, Tennessee in March 2013 as a result of the sale of Newport Television's stations to Nexstar Broadcasting (Nexstar generally does not carry subchannel networks in any form; WHBF-TV in Rock Island, Illinois, acquired by Nexstar in September 2013, eventually dropped LWN at the start of 2014, but it has since been replaced by a standard-definition simulcast of a sister station in the market).

KMCI-TV in Kansas City, Missouri, removed the network in favor of Bounce TV in October 2013, while Salt Lake City, Utah's KSL-TV would add Cozi TV at LWN's expense in January 2014. On February 17, 2014, KMOV in St. Louis dropped the network, as new owner Meredith Corporation plans on using the bandwidth for ATSC M/H mobile DTV, better known by the brand name Dyle (the subchannel was later re-launched to allow the launch of a replacement MyNetworkTV affiliate for the St. Louis area).

The Phoenix DMA is the largest TV market that did not have a Live Well Network affiliate, since Scripps-owned KNXV-TV (an ABC affiliate) switched to Antenna TV in January 2014, citing viewer demand for the classic TV network as the reason for dropping Live Well.

On June 9, 2014, network vice president Peggy Allen and ABC Owned Television Stations president Rebecca Campbell jointly announced to Live Well Network's staff that they planned to shut down the network in January 2015. Campbell and Allen stated that despite the success of the network, the division wanted to prioritize "local content" and its "core local news brands". Some of the network's shows might move over to the fyi cable network, a network ABC holds a half-interest in with Hearst Corporation via the A&E Networks joint venture. Many of the shows from ABC's stations are expected to end production.

On January 13, 2015, via an announcement by Green Bay affiliate WBAY-TV (and later confirmed by Chicago media writer Robert Feder), ABC announced that the network would be extended for two further months from their previous close date of January 16, 2015 with a revised program schedule to allow their remaining affiliates additional time to find subchannel programming.

Two days later, ABCOTS and the E. W. Scripps Company announced a pickup of Katz Broadcasting's new subchannel Laff, including the DT3 subchannels of the ABC O&O stations, as of April 15, 2015; within that announcement, ABCOTS stated that Live Well Network would continue on their eight stations on their DT2 subchannels in HD, but no longer be distributed outside of ABC O&O stations. As of April 15, 2015, WBAY and all of the former Young stations now owned by Media General continued to run the network, with no mention of any new alternate programming for those subchannels. On May 29, 2015, Comcast was informed that Media General was dropping Live Well from their stations beginning May 30, 2015. Subsequently, the signal was pulled off the Media General stations at the close of business on May 29, with those stations either carrying still text cards apologizing for the end of the network and announcements of replacement programming to come, or carrying alternate station programming. Its final LWN affiliate station in Washington, DC, officially dropped the network on October 31, 2015, when it was replaced by Comet, completing the dropping on the network outside ABC-owned stations.

Programming

As Live Well Network
Many of the network's shows were produced by the local ABC Owned Television Stations. Initially, the network only had three hours of original programming that looped throughout the day, all sourced from ABC stations. The network expanded to six hours of original programming on January 11, 2011, when six more half-hour shows were added. This allowed the programming block to loop three times daily; with rotating episodes to ensure a given episode would not air more than twice in a day.

By July 2011, the network was scheduling 18 hours of original programming with 1 hour set aside for local programming. In September 2011, 3 hours of children's E/I shows were added.

In February 2014, WPVI-TV Philadelphia and LWN were seeking participants for a pilot episode of Pop the Question, a reality series featuring wedding proposals.

FYI, a cable specialty channel partly owned by Disney through A&E Networks, would take on some of the Live Well Network programs with the network's contraction. Sweet Retreats was picked up starting on October 10, 2014, by FYI.

Localish
Localish content was originally available via online (ABC.com and stations' website, ABC apps), its over-the-top platforms (Roku, Apple TV, Amazon Fire TV), social media (Facebook Watch, Twitter, YouTube Instagram) and syndicated by Oath and Apple News.

Video quality
The network broadcasts in a lower-bandwidth form of 720p HD format in order to preserve bandwidth for the main HD station signal and additional 480i digital subchannels.

Cable carriage is also featured in the ABC O&O markets (e.g., Xfinity in Chicago, Fresno, Houston, Philadelphia and San Francisco; Spectrum in Los Angeles and the Research Triangle; Altice USA in New York City), either as the full HD feed or a 480i standard definition version. As of December 2017, WLS-TV only carries a standard definition version of the network due to a channel sharing agreement with UniMas station WXFT-DT which requires a high definition broadcast of that station.

Past Live Well Network affiliates
Affiliates were given 1 hour of programming time by July 2011, more than 5 minutes of advertising time per hour and responsibility for gaining cable carriage.

References

External links
 
 

Television networks in the United States
English-language television stations in the United States
Television channels and stations established in 2009
Disney Media Networks
Television channels and networks about health
2009 establishments in the United States
HD-only channels